Mycale is a group of four vocalists-arrangers assembled by John Zorn in 2009 to create original a cappella arrangements from  his Book of Angels compositions. Composed of Ayelet Rose Gottlieb, Sofia Rei, Sara Serpa and Malika Zarra,  Mycale sings texts in Hebrew, French, Spanish, Portuguese and Arabic from the Hebrew Bible, Rumi, Fernando Pessoa, and Heraclitus.

Discography
Gomory: Book of Angels Volume 25 (Tzadik Records 2015)		
Mycale: Book of Angels Volume 13 (Tzadik Records 2010)

References

External links
Gomory: Book of Angels 
Official website 

Vocal ensembles